Pythiales is an order of water-molds (oomycetes). Some species of this order are the causative agents of several economically important plant diseases, such as potato blight.

References

Water mould plant pathogens and diseases
Heterokont orders
Water moulds